Pieczarki may refer to:
Pieczarki, Kętrzyn County, Poland
Pieczarki, Węgorzewo County, Poland